"A Touch of Murder" is the first episode in the BBC drama serial I, Claudius, based on the novels by Robert Graves. It was first broadcast on 20 September 1976 on BBC 2, in a two-hour special, along with the second episode Family Affairs, and subsequent DVD and VHS releases put the two episodes together. It first aired at 9:00 pm and finished at 9:50, with the next episode straight after, and was later repeated on 25 September at 10:20 pm.

Plot
The story begins with an old Claudius in his study, just starting to write the 'strange' history of his family. Whilst he is writing he remembers a few years back when he heard the Sibyl's prophecy. She predicted he would get a position everybody but him wanted, that in 1900 years his history will be read and at long last Claudius will speak clearly. The story then returns to the old Claudius, who begins his family history with the rivalry between Marcus Agrippa and Marcellus.

The year is 24BC and the Emperor Augustus is having celebrations for the seventh anniversary of the Battle of Actium. Marcellus – Augustus's son in law and nephew – does not think much of the battle and believes that people go on about it too much. Marcus Agrippa – who fought in the battle and is an old friend of Augustus – does not take kindly to his opinion and later leaves in a huff, after Marcellus makes a particularly biting comment. Later on Marcus Agrippa leaves Rome for the East, because he believes he is no longer any use where he is, although he denies his decision has anything to do with Marcellus and his popularity with the people of Rome, especially over him.

Whilst Augustus is away on an inspection trip and Julia – Augustus's child from his first marriage and Marcellus's wife – and Octavia – Augustus's sister and Marcellus's mother – are away on holiday, Marcellus falls ill with stomach flu. Livia – Augustus's second wife – takes over as his nurse and starts cooking for him, citing the fact that she had earlier got Augustus better again from a previous, unseen illness. Marcellus, though only falls more ill and he dies, with the official diagnosis being food poisoning. His death results in a great public outcry in Rome and there are demonstrations and riots. Augustus is forced to recall Marcus Agrippa to help him govern. Agrippa agrees, as long as he can marry Julia, so he will be heir to Augustus, which is what he always wanted. This incenses Livia, as she wants her son Tiberius – from her previous marriage – to marry Julia, so he can become the next Emperor after Augustus has died.

Cast
Brian Blessed as Emperor Augustus
Derek Jacobi as Claudius
Frances White as Julia
Siân Phillips as Livia
John Paul as Marcus Agrippa
Christopher Guard as Marcellus
Angela Morant as Octavia
George Baker as Tiberius
Freda Dowie as The Sybil

References 

1976 British television episodes
I, Claudius
British television series premieres